Zhanghengite is a mineral consisting of 80% copper and zinc, 10% iron with the balance made up of chromium and aluminium.  Its color is golden yellow. It was discovered in 1986 during the analysis of the Bo Xian meteorite and is named after Zhang Heng, an ancient Chinese astronomer.

See also

List of minerals named after people

References

Native element minerals
Copper minerals
Zinc minerals
Cubic minerals
Minerals in space group 229